Ruti Zisser (born July 1974) is an Israeli American lifestyle designer, fashion designer, wardrobe stylist, and business woman, publicly known by her first name, Ruti Zisser is the founder of a fashion company manufacturing and distributing her designs, and showcasing Israeli fashion designers internationally.

Biography 
Ruti Zisser was born in Haifa, Israel on July 21, 1974. In 1977 Zisser moved with her family to Brussels, Belgium and in 1982, to Munich, Germany. In 1986 Zisser moved back to Israel and the family settled in Tel Aviv. In 1999, Zisser immigrated to the US.

Zisser's career didn't start in fashion. In her late twenties and early thirties, she worked in the tech industry. She self reflected that she was never satisfied and happy working in tech: "For many years I never had the courage to admit to myself, and to the people around me, that my heart was in a different place, far away from algorithms and artificial intelligence. The world of technology was not for me; I’ve always preferred the human touch." Zisser was married in 2002, and has three children, Yoav, Tamar and Guy.

Company 

RUTI Inc. is a privately held company founded by Zisser in 2009 in her garage in Palo Alto. 
Zisser's company emphasizes cool, flattering and comfortable clothing for all ages. "I'm here to change your relationship with your closet. We’ve always been told that beauty hurts - that we must give up comfort in the name of style and compromise sophistication for whatever is fashionable. That’s where I come in." - Ruti Zisser

History 
The first RUTI retail location opened on October 5, 2009 in Palo Alto. The second boutique opened on Fillmore Street, in San Francisco and was designed by Nicole Hollis, a San Francisco-based interior designer. The Santa Monica store was the third boutique to open, and is designed by Karina Tollman and Philipp Thomanek from Israel. The 4th RUTI boutique to open was the Berkeley store on 4th St. The  Venice store opened on vibrant Abbot Kinney street in 2013. Taking the success of their brick-and-mortar boutiques online, RUTI launched an eCommerce website in late 2014. In 2016, RUTI opened a new HQ office and showroom in Belmont, CA where all development and design for the RUTI label takes place. In an effort to continue the direct to consumer strategy, new boutiques are expected to open in Scottsdale, Miami and Seattle in 2018.

Introducing Israeli Designers to the US market 
From the beginning, Ruti has been showcasing fashion in her boutiques. In 2009, Ruti introduced the  Israeli brand Alembika by designer Hagar Alembic to the US Market. The collaboration between Zisser and Hagar Alembic led to co-designed items.

References 

Israeli Jews
Israeli fashion designers
Israeli women fashion designers
Jewish fashion designers
American company founders
American women company founders
American fashion businesspeople
American fashion designers
American women fashion designers
American women business executives
American business executives
Ruti
Privately held companies based in California
Ruti
Living people
1974 births
21st-century American women